Frederick Melsheimer may refer to:

 Frederick Valentine Melsheimer (1749–1814), Lutheran clergyman and American entomologist
 Frederick Ernst Melsheimer (1782–1873), American entomologist